Toonami: Deep Space Bass is the official soundtrack album to Cartoon Network's action TV block Toonami, released on May 15, 2001. It contains music from various shows' intros, outros, and promo spots, along with other Toonami music, including selections from Toonami's Midnight Run and The Intruder specials. All of the tracks were recorded by Joe Boyd Vigil, who composed Toonami's score from 1999 through 2002. The album is out of print.

Deep Space Bass Track listing

Toonami: Black Hole Megamix 
There were plans for a follow-up album to be released, but due to Deep Space Bass'''s low sales, along with several other factors, the album was never officially released. However, the 21-track, 58-minute CD was officially leaked to, and released on The Toonami Digital Arsenal for free download.

The Black Hole Megamix was mixed by Toonami producer and co-creator Jason DeMarco (who also produced the Deep Space Bass album), under the mantle of DJ Clarknova. It focused on a wide array of Toonami beats (both old and new, at the time of its release), and featured sound bytes from both Toonami and Adult Swim programs.

 Toonami: Supernova Megamix 
In December 2012, the official Toonami tumblr celebrated the inclusion of Twitter to Nielsen ratings by posing a challenge: if fans could get the tumblr page to 3500 followers and make every program shown on Toonami's December 22 broadcast trend nationally on Twitter, an official sequel to Black Hole Megamix would be released on Christmas Day. Despite the page not reaching 3500 followers, the Toonami page released the Supernova Megamix on December 24.

The official release message from Toonami on Mon December 24, 2012 at 8:05pm:

The Supernova Megamix was mixed by Skull Island, composed of Jason DeMarco and musician Brent Busby. Among other tracks, the album included voice acting outtakes from Peter Cullen and Steve Blum, as well as a remixed version of Com Truise's Brokendate (included in the first Toonami promo after its revival, To Hell With Fear).

 IGPX: The Ichi Megamix 
On December 12, 2013, on the official Tumblr page, Toonami announced the production of a mixtape of songs from IGPX mixed by Skull Island named after Team Satomi's mechanic, Ichi. During the time, there was a contest to decide the cover art for the megamix submitted by fans through the official tumblr and Jason DeMarco's twitter, @clarknova1. The winner of the contest would receive a free Toonami T-shirt that was also being given out during the December 2013 T-shirt Sweepstakes. The winning cover was chosen on the 23rd and was designed by Todd Jensen with an alternate cover also chosen as a "back cover"  that was created by Cody Silfies. The album was released on December 25.

The official message from the Toonami staff on Christmas Day:

In 2014, there was no megamix or mixtape released by Toonami at all due to a lack of organization.

Intruder 2 Soundtrack

On December 20, 2015, Toonami released a soundtrack containing musical pieces from the "Intruder 2" Total Immersion Event.

 Attics and Inventory Pt. 2 

On December 31, 2015, Toonami released a mixtape titled Attics and Inventory Pt. 2 by artist Chris Devoe. It was announced via the official Toonami Tumblr page and released at adultswim.com.

Intruder 3 Soundtrack

On November 28, 2016, Toonami released a soundtrack containing musical pieces from the "Intruder 3" Total Immersion Event.

References

External links
 [ Allmusic.com: Review]
 Billboard.com
 Album Review at Toonami Fan

Joe Boyd Vigil albums
2001 debut albums
Rhino Records albums